Fautario is a surname. Notable people with the surname include:

Hector Fautario (1924–2017), Argentine Air Force general
Simone Fautario (born 1987), Italian footballer